Whiting is a given name. Notable people with the name include:

Almon Whiting Babbitt (1812–1856), early leader in the Latter Day Saint movement
George Whiting Badman (1886–1953), South Australian business man, horse breeder and owner
Carl Whiting Bishop (1881–1942), American archeologist specializing in East Asian civilizations
Richard Whiting Blue (1841–1907), U.S. Representative from Kansas
William Whiting Boardman (1794–1871), politician and United States Representative from Connecticut
William Whiting Borden (1887–1913), philanthropist and millionaire Christian missionary candidate
George Whiting Flagg (1816–1897), was an American painter of historical scenes and genre pictures
Whiting Griswold (1814–1874), American abolitionist, lawyer and politician
Francis Whiting Halsey (1851–1919), American journalist, editor and historian
Gerry Whiting Hazelton (1829–1920), American lawyer and Republican politician
Caroline Lee Whiting Hentz (1800–1856), American novelist and author
Luther Whiting Mason (1818–1896), American music educator hired by the Meiji period government of Japan 
Christine Whiting Parmenter (1877–1953), American author
Rex Whiting Pearson (1905–1961), Australian politician
Lucien Whiting Powell (1846–1930), landscape painter who gave the village of Airmont, Virginia its name
Barbara Whiting Smith (1931–2004), actress in movies and on radio and television
Joseph Whiting Stock (1815–1855), American painter of portraits, miniatures, and landscape paintings
Walker Whiting Vick (1878–1926), aide to Woodrow Wilson in 1912, officer of the Democratic National Committee
Whiting Willauer (1906–1962), American ambassador to Costa Rica and Honduras
Whiting Williams (1878–1975), author, co-founder of the Welfare Federation of Cleveland
Charles Whiting Wooster, Commander-in-Chief of the Chilean Navy

See also
Waiting (disambiguation)
Weeting
Weighting
Whitening (disambiguation)
Whitin (disambiguation)
Whitting